Bishop Sava of Edmonton (born Jovan Saračević, 22 February 1902 – 30 January 1973) was a Bishop of the Russian Orthodox Church Outside of Russia. He served auxiliary bishop of Edmonton, vicar of the Diocese of Montreal and Canada.

Biography
Bishop Sava of Edmonton was of Serbian nationality. He was born in the village of Ljutovnica near Belgrade. He studied at the schools of the cities of Čačak and Kragujevac, and graduated from the Faculty of Law of the University of Belgrade. He worked as a lawyer, then as a judge in various cities of Yugoslavia (Trelog, Čačak, Gnjilane, and Belgrade).

While practicing law, he also began studying at the theological faculty of Belgrade University. He graduated in 1943.

After coming to power in Yugoslavia, the Communists began to persecute him as an educated Christian and a man who occupied a prominent place under the old regime. This forced him to leave his homeland.

In early 1948 he went to Buenos Aires, then traveled to Paraguay to meet Bishop , where he joined the monastic community created there by Bishop Leontius. In the same year, Bishop Leontius tonsured him in the Rassophore, and on the Feast of the Annunciation raised him to the office of Deacon.

He served there for more than six years.

In May 1958, Archimandrite Sava reached an agreement with the artist LN Ryk-Kovalevskaya, where the latter had to write an icon for the iconostasis. Funds were raised by appealing to the parishioners who had to choose an icon and pay for the letter. Concerts were also held to contribute in building the temple. These initiatives were successful, immediately the raising all necessary funds for the church construction. He served in Temperley until his departure for New York in August 1958.

By the decision of the Holy Synod, he was elected Bishop of Edmonton, vicar of the Archbishop of Montreal and Canada Vitaly (Ustinov).

He was an admirer of Archbishop John (Maximovich) and helped him with legal advice during his trial in San Francisco, which ended with the full justification of the saint. After the death of the Bishop, he collected materials about his life, which became the basis for publications of his work "Orthodox Russia", and then for the book "Chronicle of the veneration of Archbishop John (Maximovich)." These testimonies played a significant role in the canonization of ROCOR Bishop John in 1994.

Archbishop , who personally knew Vladyka Savva in service in Argentina, wrote that among the hierarchs of the Church Abroad, he was an archpastor, outstanding in his education, eloquence and zeal in the ministry of the Church. Metropolitan Hilarion (Kapral), whom Bishop Savva inspired to accept monasticism, recalled that he was a man of high spiritual life, always referred to the patristic teaching in the conversations and was unusually kind.

Bishop Sava perfectly knew the works of the Church Fathers, personally copied them (thus belonged to the ancient monastic tradition, according to which rewriting the writings of the Holy Fathers is an important way to purify the mind for the knowledge of patristic Tradition). He called for the creation of the Brotherhood of Spiritual Renaissance, which promoted the need for intensified prayer for the suffering of Russia. Particular attention was also paid to the care of converts in Canada and the United States.

In September 1971, he retired.

He died on January 30, 1973, in Edmonton, Canada. He was buried in the territory of the Holy Intercession Monastery in Bluffton, Alberta, Canada.

Bibliography
 
 Archbishop Athanasius of Argentina, The Necrology of Bishop Sava, Published in Nasha Strana, Buenos Aires, no. 1198, Feb. 6, 1973.
 Dragan Suboti - From our spiritual tower: bishop Sava edmontski (Govan Sarachevi, 1902-1973), ZRNM XXVIII, Chachak, 1998, pp. 251–259)

Published works
 Saračević, Jovan (1934), Самоубиство као последица моралне одговорности свештеника — одговор свештенику г. Милутиновићу, «Чачански глас», бр. 12, Чачак, 25. March 1934, p. 4.

References/Notes and references

External links
 Bishop Sava of Edmonton
 Bishop Sava (Saračević) (1902-1973)
 Bishop Sava (obituary)
 Destiny Crossed Three Bishops („Вечерње новости”, February 26, 2017)

Bishops of the Russian Orthodox Church Outside of Russia
Eastern Orthodox bishops in Canada
University of Belgrade people
Serbian legal scholars
1902 births
1973 deaths